Herbert Roper Barrett and Harold Nisbet defeated Frank Riseley and Sydney Smith 6–2, 2–6, 6–8, 8–6, 6–2 in the All Comers' Final, but the reigning champions Laurence Doherty and Reginald Doherty defeated Barrett and Nisbet 9–7, 7–5, 4–6, 3–6, 6–3 in the challenge round to win the gentlemen's doubles tennis title at the 1900 Wimbledon Championships.

Draw

Challenge round

All Comers'

References

External links

Men's Doubles
Wimbledon Championship by year – Men's doubles